Bernhard Englbrecht (born February 16, 1958 in Landshut) is a German former professional ice hockey goaltender and coach. He was selected by the Atlanta Flames in the 12th round (196th overall) of the 1978 NHL Amateur Draft.

Career 
Englbrecht began his coaching career in 2001 with EV Landshut. He was a coach with the Germany men's national ice hockey team at the 2001 IIHF World Championship.

Englbrecht took over the head coaching duties for the Straubing Tigers during the 2010–11 DEL season.

Between December 2015 and January 2017 he had the position of head coach at EV Landshut.

References

External links

1958 births
Living people
Sportspeople from Landshut
Atlanta Flames draft picks
EV Landshut players
German ice hockey coaches
German ice hockey goaltenders
Nürnberg Ice Tigers players
SC Riessersee players
Ice hockey players at the 1980 Winter Olympics
Ice hockey players at the 1984 Winter Olympics
Olympic ice hockey players of West Germany